Fatemeh Dehghani (Persian: فاطمه دهقانی) (born 1996, Tehran) is an Iranian oud player, best known for her trio music of Iranian folk music and Persian classical music with Sara Hasti (kemenche) and Farideh Sarsangi (percussion and santur). She is a musician, music teacher and campaigner against sexism in music.

Discography
The Spirit Afar (2020)

References

Iranian oud players

Iranian women musicians

1996 births

Living people